James Andrew Leyva (born May 14, 1991), better known by the stage name Valentina, is an American drag performer, actor, television personality and singer who came to international attention as a contestant on the ninth season of RuPaul's Drag Race and the fourth season of RuPaul's Drag Race All Stars.

Early life 
Valentina was born in Bell, California to Mexican parents, and began working as a professional drag queen around ten months before filming RuPaul's Drag Race, although they already had a background in fashion and the performing arts. Leyva chose to go by "Valentina" in drag after the hot sauce of the same name. Valentina is known for using her drag as a way to represent Latin American culture on stage and make drag more accepted in Latin American culture.

Career 
In 2015, Valentina won an early club version of the Boulet Brothers' "Dragula" contest, a precursor of the television show.

On February 2, 2017, Valentina was announced as one of fourteen contestants competing for the ninth season of RuPaul's Drag Race. She was eliminated in episode nine to Nina Bo'Nina Brown after infamously losing a lipsync battle to "Greedy" by Ariana Grande; she was reluctant to take off a mask covering her mouth as she did not know the lyrics to the song, a moment which went viral across social media. She placed seventh overall, and their elimination sparked some controversy online as she was popular with fans. She was later voted as "Miss Congeniality" by the viewers of the show, but was mockingly dubbed "Fan Favorite" by her castmates, due to their view that she was unsuitable for a congenial title. During the season 10 finale, Valentina appeared via a pre-recorded video message to crown her successor for the Miss Congeniality title, Monét X Change.

Outside of Drag Race, Valentina appeared in the sixth episode of the twenty-fourth season of America's Next Top Model, in a photo shoot challenge with fellow Drag Race alumni Manila Luzon and Katya. She played Judy Reyes's character Quiet Ann in a season-one recap of Claws. In 2017, she was the host of her own WoWPresents internet show, "La Vida De Valentina" which ran for seven episodes.

Valentina was in the October 2017 issue of Vogue Mexico, and filmed a makeup tutorial for Vogue's YouTube channel. She was in the July 2017 issue of Elle Mexico modeling designs by Benito Santos for his Red Carpet 2018 campaign. She appeared in the January 2018 issue of Filipino magazine Preview. In April 2019, Valentina appeared in Vogue Mexico for a second time.

On November 9, 2018, Valentina was announced as a contestant on the upcoming fourth season of RuPaul's Drag Race: All Stars, a spin-off of the regular Drag Race series which features returning contestants from past seasons. After being in the bottom three times and only scoring one win, Valentina was eliminated in the seventh episode by Latrice Royale, when she failed to impress the judges in a design challenge, causing her and Naomi Smalls to be up for elimination.

In January 2019, Valentina portrayed Angel Dumott Schunard in Fox's televised production of the musical Rent, Rent: Live. In June 2019, a panel of judges from New York magazine placed Valentina 20th on their list of "the most powerful drag queens in America", a ranking of 100 former Drag Race contestants. In 2021, she made a cameo appearance in In the Heights, during "No Me Diga".

Music
Valentina released her debut single, "A Prueba de Todo", in December 2018.

 Legacy Drag Race: All Stars winner Alaska Thunderfuck did a parody song of "Despacito" called "Valentina" in October 2017, with lyrics about Valentina and her infamous elimination from the show. The cosmetics company Lush also referenced Valentina’s elimination for advertising on one of their face masks.

In 2019, Valentina came out as non-binary, stating that she will continue to use "she/her" pronouns. Valentina is now one of several Drag Race alumni who identify as either nonbinary or gender-nonconforming.

She is one of the most followed queens from Drag Race'', and has accumulated over 1.5 million Instagram followers as of October, 2021.

Filmography

Television

Films

Music videos

Discography

Singles

As featured artist

References

External links 
 

1991 births
Living people
American people of Mexican descent
Gay entertainers
LGBT Hispanic and Latino American people
LGBT people from California
People from Los Angeles
American non-binary actors
RuPaul's Drag Race contestants
Valentina
Non-binary drag performers
Hispanic and Latino American drag queens
LGBT people in Latin music